Den (Macedonian Cyrillic: Ден) was a short lived national daily newspaper in North Macedonia with its headquarters in Skopje. It was founded in March 2012, and ceased to exist in 2013. 2017 onwards, Den exists online, at the website .

References

Newspapers published in North Macedonia
Macedonian-language newspapers